Marcos Pasquim (born June 14, 1969 in São Paulo) is a Brazilian actor who has been appeared on both television and film.

TV filmography
 2012 - Cheias de Charme.... Gilson
 2011 - Morde & Assopra.... Abner
 2009 - Caras & Bocas .... Denis
 2008 - Guerra e Paz .... Pedro Guerra / Tony Tijuana
 2006 - Pé na Jaca .... Lance (Antônio Carlos Lancelotti)
 2005 - Bang Bang .... Crazy Jake
 2005 - A Lua Me Disse .... Tadeu
 2003 - Kubanacan .... Esteban / Adriano Allende / León
 2002 - O Quinto dos Infernos (minissérie) .... D. Pedro I
 2001 - Estrela-Guia .... Edmilson
 2000 - Uga-Uga .... Van Damme (Casimiro)
 1998/1999 - Chiquititas .... Filipe Mendes Ayala / Manuel
 1998 - Brida (participação especial)
 1997 - Mandacaru .... Eduardo Alencar
 1997 - Malhação .... Milton
 1997 - Você Decide ....
 1996 - The Nutty Professor  .... Bill Bucaneraando
 1995 - Cara e Coroa .... Cosme

Movies
Bed & Breakfast....Gustavo
Seus problemas acabaram!.... Himself
Xuxa e o Tesouro da Cidade Perdida.... Igor

References

1969 births
Living people
Male actors from São Paulo
Brazilian male telenovela actors
Brazilian male television actors